Manuel Salvat (1900 – death date unknown) was a Cuban second baseman in the Negro leagues in the 1920s.

A native of Havana, Cuba, Salvat played for the Cuban Stars (East) in 1925. In 14 recorded games, he posted five hits in 54 plate appearances.

References

External links
 and Seamheads

1900 births
Date of birth missing
Year of death missing
Place of death missing
Cuban Stars (East) players
Baseball second basemen
Baseball players from Havana